Bulla Regia was a Berber, Punic, and Roman town near present-day Jendouba, Tunisia. Its surviving ruins and archaeological site are noted for their Hadrianic-era semi-subterranean housing, a protection from the fierce heat and effects of the sun. Many of the mosaic floors have been left in place; others may be seen at the Bardo Museum in Tunis. There is also a small museum connected with the site.

Names

The name Bulla Regia is Latin for "Royal Bulla". The epithet refers to its status as the Numidian capital under Masinissa. It was notionally refounded at the time of its elevation to colony status and formally named  after its imperial sponsor Hadrian.

History

Berber town
A Berber settlement probably predated the Punic one. Imported Greek ceramics dating to the 4th centuryBC have been found.

Punic town
Carthage gained control over the town during the 3rd centuryBC, when inscriptions reveal that the inhabitants venerated Baal Hammon and buried their dead in urns in the Punic style. A capital from a temple of Tanit is preserved at the site's museum.

Numidian capital
Bulla Regia was part of the territory won for Rome by Scipio Africanus in 203BC during the Second Punic War. The Numidian king Masinissa "recovered the lands of his ancestors" (as noted in an inscription) and made Bulla his capital in 156BC. One of his sons maintained a palace in the city. Under the Numidians, a regularized orthogonal grid street plan was imposed in the hellenistic manner on at least part of the earlier irregular system.

Roman colony

The Romans assumed direct control in 46BC, when Julius Caesar organized the province of Africa and rewarded the (perhaps simply neutral) conduct of Bulla during the recent civil war by making it a free city. Under Hadrian, it was raised to the status of a Roman colony and its citizens given full citizenship.

Destruction
Bulla Regia slowly lost importance under Byzantine rule. As elsewhere in the late empire, the local aristocracy found themselves in a position to increase the extent of their houses at the expense of public space: the House of the Fisherman was adapted to link two separate , turning a thoroughfare into a dead end. An earthquake destroyed Bulla Regia, collapsing its first floors into the subterranean floors.

Re-discovery

Drifting sand protected the abandoned sites, which were forgotten until the first excavations were begun in 1906, in part spurred by the destruction of the monumental entrance to the Roman city.

The forum, surrounded by porticoes, was excavated 1949–52. Its public basilica had an apse at each end. As a cathedral, it had a highly unusual cruciform baptismal font inserted in the center of the rear (west end) of its nave. Its small amphitheater, the subject of a reproach in a sermon of Augustine of Hippo, retains the crispness of its edges and steps because it lay buried until 1960–61.

Museum and archeological site

Bulla Regia is now an archeological site. There is a museum, and underground tours are available. Restoration work aims to protect the buildings, which are well-preserved due to being largely built underground. Most of the elaborate polychrome mosaics are being conserved in-situ, allowing visitors to see them in their original architectural context. The Roman drainage system has been restored to keep the houses from flooding.

Buildings

In the unique domus architecture developed in the city, a ground-level storey, open to the warming winter sun, stood above a subterranean level, built round a two-story atrium. Open-bottomed terracotta bottle-shapes were built into vaulting. Water sprinkled on the floors brought the colors of the mosaics to life while they provided cooling by evaporation.

In the House of the Hunt, the basilica, with an apse at its head, a transept and dependent spaces opening into what would be the nave if it were a church, has been instanced (Thébert) as an example of the conjunction between public architecture and the domus of the ruling class in the fourth century, spaces soon to be Christianized as churches and cathedrals.

The subtle colors and shading and the modelling of three-dimensional forms of the finest mosaics at Bulla Regia are not surpassed by any in North Africa, where the Roman art of mosaic floors reached its fullest development. The mosaic of a haloed Amphitrite (House of Amphitrite) is often illustrated (see image above).

Religion
Bulla Regia was important enough to become a bishopric, suffragan of Carthage, which transformed the civil basilica into its cathedral. Bulla Regia  was the seat of an ancient bishopric bearing its name. The bishopric was founded during the Roman Empire and survived through the Arian Vandal Kingdom and Orthodox Byzantine Empire, only declined with the city and the arrival of Islam.

Its bishops have included:

 Jules Girard (8 July 1921 23 March 1950)
 Herbert Bednorz (4 May 1950 12 November 1967)
 Titular Archbishop Pierre Martin Ngô Đình Thục (17 February 1968 13 December 1984), retired Metropolitan Archbishop of Huê
 Adam Marcinkowski (23 February 1985 on), Auxiliary Bishop of Płock

References

Citations

Bibliography
 . 
 .
 .

Further reading
The excavations at Bulla Regia were published as Les ruines de Bulla Regia, A. Besaouch, R. Hanoune, and Y. Thébert, Rome, 1977.

External links

 World Monuments Fund website about Bulla Regia
 Website about Bulla Regia
 Website about Bulla Regia 
 Virtual tourist site
 GigaCatholic with titular incumbent biography links

Phoenician colonies in Tunisia
Roman towns and cities in Tunisia
Catholic titular sees in Africa
Jendouba Governorate
Underground cities